Prince Kazimierz Czartoryski (4 March 1674 – 31 August 1741) was a Polish nobleman, Duke of Klewań and .

Kazimierz became Podczaszy of Lithuania since 1699, Grand Treasurer of Lithuania in 1707–1709, nominated by King Stanisław Leszczyński. He was also Deputy Chancellor of Lithuania in 1712–1724. Castellan of Vilnius since 1724 and starost of Krzemieniec, Wieliż and Uświaty.

He founded the "Familia" during the interregnum in 1696–1699. He supported the candidature of François Louis, Prince of Conti for the Polish throne in 1697.

Family

In 1693 he married Izabela Morsztyn, daughter of Jan Andrzej Morsztyn and Katarzyna Gordon. They had three sons and two daughters.

 Michał Fryderyk (1696-1775), Duke of Klewań and Żuków
 August Aleksander (1697-1782), father of Adam Kazimierz Czartoryski
 Konstancja (1700-1759), mother of King Stanisława Augusta Poniatowskiego
 Ludwika Elżbieta (1703-1745)
 Teodor Kazimierz (1704-1768), bishop of Poznań

References

1674 births
1741 deaths
Nobility from Warsaw
Kazimierz
Deputy Chancellors of the Grand Duchy of Lithuania
Grand Treasurers of the Grand Duchy of Lithuania
Recipients of the Order of the White Eagle (Poland)